Kailas Gorantyal is a leader of Indian National Congress and a member of the Maharashtra Legislative Assembly elected from Jalna Assembly constituency in Jalna city.

Positions held
 2019: Elected to Maharashtra Legislative Assembly.

References

Living people
Maharashtra MLAs 2019–2024
Indian National Congress politicians from Maharashtra
People from Jalna, Maharashtra
Year of birth missing (living people)